David Lollia (born December 20, 1969, in Paris, France) is a former professional footballer who played as a midfielder.

External links
David Lollia profile at chamoisfc79.fr

1969 births
Living people
French footballers
Association football midfielders
Valenciennes FC players
Chamois Niortais F.C. players
Tours FC players
US Créteil-Lusitanos players
Associação Naval 1º de Maio players
Ligue 2 players
Olympique Noisy-le-Sec players
AS Poissy players
AS Choisy-le-Roi players